Acanthophila pusillella is a moth in the family Gelechiidae.  It is found in Russia, where it is known only from the southern part of Primorsky Krai.

The wingspan is 9.5–10 mm. The forewings are dark grey with scattered light grey scales and a light grey costal stroke near three-fourths of length, as well as five to six indistinct blackish dots along the apex and termen, and four more or less distinct blackish spots found at the middle and the end of the cell, at one-fourth and at the middle of the anal fold. The hindwings are grey.

References

pusillella
Moths of Asia
Moths described in 2003